The Asia/Oceania Zone was one of three zones of regional competition in the 2011 Fed Cup.

Group I
Venue: National Tennis Centre, Nonthaburi, Thailand (hard, outdoors)
Date: Week of 31 January (ties played 2–4 February)

The eight teams were divided into two pools of four teams. The winners of both pools played off to decide which nation progresses to World Group II play-offs. Nations finished fourth in each pool play-off to determine which nation was relegated to Asia/Oceania Zone Group II for 2012

Pools

Play-offs

 advanced to World Group II play-offs.
 relegated to Asia/Oceania Group II in 2012.

Group II
Venue: National Tennis Centre, Nonthaburi, Thailand (hard, outdoors)
Date: Week of 31 January (ties played 2–5 February)

The eight teams were divided into two pools of four teams. The winners of both pools played off to decide which nation was promoted to the Asia/Oceania Zone Group I for 2012.

Pools

Play-offs 

 promoted to Asia/Oceania Group I in 2012.

See also
Fed Cup structure

References

 Fed Cup 2011, Asia/Oceania, Group I
 Fed Cup 2011, Asia/Oceania, Group II

External links
 Fed Cup website

 
Asia Oceania
Sport in Nonthaburi province
Tennis tournaments in Thailand